In geometry, the Szilassi polyhedron is a nonconvex polyhedron, topologically a torus, with seven hexagonal faces.

Coloring and symmetry
The 14 vertices and 21 edges of the Szilassi polyhedron form an embedding of the Heawood graph onto the surface of a torus.
Each face of this polyhedron shares an edge with each other face. As a result, it requires seven colours to colour all adjacent faces. This example shows that, on surfaces topologically equivalent to a torus, some subdivisions require seven colors, providing the lower bound for the seven colour theorem. The other half of the theorem states that all toroidal subdivisions can be colored with seven or fewer colors.

The Szilassi polyhedron has an axis of 180-degree symmetry. This symmetry swaps three pairs of congruent faces, leaving one unpaired hexagon that has the same rotational symmetry as the polyhedron.

Complete face adjacency

The tetrahedron and the Szilassi polyhedron are the only two known polyhedra in which each face shares an edge with each other face.

If a polyhedron with f  faces is embedded onto a surface with h  holes, in such a way that each face shares an edge with each other face, it follows by some manipulation of the Euler characteristic that

This equation is satisfied for the tetrahedron with h = 0 and f = 4, and for the Szilassi polyhedron with h = 1 and f = 7.

The next possible solution, h = 6 and f = 12, would correspond to a polyhedron with 44 vertices and 66 edges. However,  it is not known whether such a polyhedron can be realized geometrically without self-crossings (rather than as an abstract polytope). More generally this equation can be satisfied precisely when f  is congruent to 0, 3, 4, or 7 modulo 12.

History

The Szilassi polyhedron is named after Hungarian mathematician Lajos Szilassi, who discovered it in 1977. Like the Szilassi polyhedron, the Császár polyhedron has the topology of a torus.

References

External links
.
.

 Szilassi Polyhedron – Papercraft model at CutOutFoldUp.com

Nonconvex polyhedra
Toroidal polyhedra
Unsolved problems in mathematics